Ronald Alfred Shayes (12 September 1912 – 17 December 1940) was a British tennis player.

A native of London, Shayes got his first introduction to tennis at the Garden Lawn Tennis Club in West Wickham and was active on tour during the 1930s. He was an architect by profession.

Shayes reached the singles fourth round at Wimbledon three times and was a doubles semi-finalist twice. In his only appearance at the U.S. National Championships in 1938 he took Bobby Riggs to five sets in a third round loss.

From 1938 to 1939, Shayes played for Great Britain in the Davis Cup. His 1939 reverse singles win over Bernard Destremau, which was considered an upset, secured a tie against France.

Shayes ended 1939 as Great Britain's third ranked player.

In 1940, Shayes was killed in a flying accident in Southern Rhodesia, while training with the Royal Air Force.

See also
List of Great Britain Davis Cup team representatives

References

External links
 
 
 

1912 births
1940 deaths
British male tennis players
English male tennis players
Tennis people from Greater London
Royal Air Force personnel of World War II
Victims of aviation accidents or incidents in Africa
Accidental deaths in Zimbabwe